Oodes parallelus is a species of ground beetle in the family Carabidae, found in the United States and Canada.

References

Licininae
Articles created by Qbugbot
Beetles described in 1830